Përpjekja shqiptare, published by Branko Merxhani, and administered by Petro Marko was a literary magazine, published in Tirana, Albania from 1936 to 1939.

The magazine was published monthly is said to have had a great influence on the modernization of the cultural life of Albania at that time. The magazine offered to the contemporary readers modern Albanian literature in prose and poetry, as well as translations from modern foreign authors. In addition it included essays on philosophy, psychoanalysis, sociology, linguistics, archeology, and history. It propagated a spiritual and cultural rebirth, called Neo-Albanianism, with a view on Western Europe.

Although it published only 27 times, the magazine had a notable influence on the Albanian culture. 1 issue was translated into French language.

See also
List of magazines in Albania

References

1936 establishments in Albania
1939 disestablishments in Albania
Albanian-language magazines
Literary magazines published in Albania
Magazines established in 1936
Magazines disestablished in 1939
Mass media in Tirana
Monthly magazines
Defunct literary magazines published in Europe
Defunct magazines published in Albania